Oro is a Spanish-language name literally meaning "gold". It may be a given name, a nickname or a surname. Notable people with the name include:

 Oro (wrestler), Jesús Javier Hernández Solís (1971–1993), Mexican professional wrestler
 Alfredo de Oro (1863–1948), Cuban billiards and pool player
 Joan Oró (1923–2004), Catalan (Spanish) biochemist
 Juan Bustillo Oro (1904–1989), Mexican film director, screenwriter and producer
 Luis Oro, Spanish chemist and professor